Hurricane Soccer & Track Stadium is a multi-purpose stadium on the campus of the University of Tulsa in Tulsa, Oklahoma. The stadium hosts the Tulsa Golden Hurricane men's soccer and women's soccer teams, as well as the  track & field team. The facility opened in  August 2003.

The stadium has seating for 2,000, plus standing room if needed.

On Wednesday, May 20, 2015 the Tulsa Roughnecks hosted the Seacoast United Phantoms in the second round of the Lamar Hunt U.S. Open Cup.

References

External links
 Information at Tulsa athletics
 

Athletics (track and field) venues in Oklahoma
College track and field venues in the United States
Sports venues in Tulsa, Oklahoma
Tulsa Golden Hurricane
Soccer venues in Oklahoma
Tulsa Golden Hurricane men's soccer
2003 establishments in Oklahoma
Sports venues completed in 2003
Tulsa Golden Hurricane women's soccer
College soccer venues in the United States
FC Tulsa